The Central District of Bam County is a district (bakhsh) in Bam County, Kerman Province, Iran. At the 2006 census, its population was 118,037, in 31,124 families.  The district has two cities: Bam and Baravat. The district has three rural districts (dehestan): Deh Bakri Rural District, Howmeh Rural District, and Kork and Nartich Rural District.

References 

Bam County
Districts of Kerman Province